Lethes is a genus of beetles in the family Cerambycidae, containing the following species:

 Lethes humeralis Zayas, 1975
 Lethes indignus Zayas, 1975
Lethes israeli Zayas, 1975
Lethes turnbowi Lingafelter, 2020
Lethes x-notatus Vlasak & Santos-Silva, 2021

References

Acanthocinini